Grän is a municipality in the district of Reutte in the Austrian state of Tyrol.

Geography
Grän lies near Lake Haldensee in the Tannheim valley, a high mountain valley on the border with Bavaria. It lies on the road to Pfronten in southern Germany.

References

Cities and towns in Reutte District